Karl Mannheim (born Károly Manheim, 27 March 1893 – 9 January 1947) was an influential Hungarian sociologist during the first half of the 20th century. He is a key figure in classical sociology, as well as one of the founders of the sociology of knowledge. Mannheim is best known for his book Ideology and Utopia (1929/1936), in which he distinguishes between partial and total ideologies, the latter representing comprehensive worldviews distinctive to particular social groups, and also between ideologies that provide outdated support for existing social arrangements, and utopias, which look to the future and threaten to transform a society.

Biography

Childhood and education 
Karl Mannheim was born 27 March 1893 in Budapest, to a Hungarian father, a textile merchant, and German mother, both of Jewish descent. His early education was in that city, he studied philosophy and literature at the University of Budapest, though he also went to Berlin (where he studied with Georg Simmel) and Paris to further his education, returning to Hungary around the start of the First World War. He obtained a PhD from the University of Budapest, and further qualifications from the University of Heidelberg.

Academic career 
During the War he was involved in a number of influential intellectual circles: the Galileo Circle founded by Karl Polanyi in which Michael Polanyi also participated, the Social Science Association organised by Oscar Jászi, and the Sonntagskreis or 'Sunday Circle' led by György Lukács. In the brief period of the Hungarian Soviet Republic, in 1919, Mannheim taught in the Pedagogical Institute of the University of Budapest thanks to the patronage of his friend and mentor Lukács, whose political conversion to communism he did not share. Both Mannheim and Lukács were forced into exile after the rise of Horthy as Regent of Hungary.  Mannheim chose exile in Germany and was there from 1920-1933.

In 1921, he married psychologist Juliska Károlyné Lang, better known as Julia Lang. Though she is often unacknowledged, Lang collaborated with Mannheim on many of his works, and along with a number of Mannheim's students, put together many of his works to be published posthumously.

After an unsuccessful attempt to gain a sponsor to teach philosophy in Heidelberg, Mannheim began work in 1924 under the German sociologist Alfred Weber, the brother of well-known sociologist Max Weber, and Emil Lederer. In 1926, Mannheim had his habilitation accepted by the faculty of social sciences, thus satisfying the requirements to teach classes in sociology at Heidelberg. Mannheim was chosen over other competitors for the post, one of whom was Walter Benjamin. From 1929-1933, he served as a professor of sociology and political economy at the Johann Wolfgang Goethe University Frankfurt am Main. Norbert Elias and Hans Gerth worked as his assistants from spring 1930 until spring 1933, with Elias as the senior partner. Greta Kuckhoff, who later became a prominent figure in the DDR, was his administrative assistant in Frankfurt, leaving early in 1933 to study at the London School of Economics (LSE) and prepare for Mannheim's emigration there.

In 1933, Mannheim was ousted from his professorship under the terms of the anti-Semitic law to purge the civil service and was forced into exile. After fleeing the Nazi regime and settling in Britain, Mannheim became a lecturer in Sociology at the London School of Economics, under a program to assist academic exiles, until his death.

In 1941, Sir Fred Clarke, Director of the Institute of Education at the University of London, invited him to teach sociology on a part-time basis in conjunction with his declining role at LSE under wartime conditions. In January 1946 he was appointed as the first sociology professor at the Institute of Education, a position he held until his death in London a year later. During his time in England, Mannheim played a prominent role in 'The Moot', a Christian discussion group of which T.S. Eliot was also a member, concerned with the role of religion and culture in society, which was convened by J. H. Oldham.  He gained a position of influence through his editorship of the extensive Routledge series on social sciences.

Mannheim's life, one of intellectual and geographical migration, falls into three main phases: Hungarian (to 1919), German (1919–1933), British (1933–1947). Among his valued interlocutors were György Lukács, Oszkár Jászi, Georg Simmel, Martin Heidegger, Edmund Husserl, Karl Marx, Alfred and Max Weber, Max Scheler, and Wilhelm Dilthey. In his work, he sought variously to synthesize elements derived from German historicism, Marxism, phenomenology, sociology, and Anglo-American pragmatism.

Death
Mannheim died in London on January 9, 1947 at the age of 53 due to a congenitally weak heart. Shortly before his death, he was invited to be the head of the European UNESCO, an offer he was unfortunately not able to accept. He was cremated at Golders Green Crematorium and his ashes were placed in the columbarium there in an urn, which were later mixed with those of his wife. He was originally placed opposite Sigmund Freud as a planned pairing, but Freud was later relocated.

Sociological work

Hungarian phase (1919) 
Mannheim was a precocious scholar and an accepted member of two influential intellectual circles in Budapest. In the autumn of 1915, he was the youngest founding member of the Sonntagskreis (Sunday Circle) alongside Béla Balázs, Lajos Fülep,  and György Lukács, where a wide range of literary and philosophical topics where discussed. Some discussion focused on the enthusiasms of German diagnosticians of cultural crisis, but also the novels of Fyodor Dostoyevsky and the writings Søren Kierkegaard and of the German mystics.  The Social Science Association, on the other hand, was founded by Oszkár Jászi in 1919 and was interested above all in French and English sociological writings. Mannheim's Hungarian writings, notably his doctoral dissertation "Structural Analysis of Epistemology," anticipate his lifelong search for "synthesis" between these currents.

According to the sociologist Longhurst, the Sonntagskreis "rejected any 'positivist' or 'mechanist' understanding of society and was dissatisfied with the existing political arrangements in Hungary. The way forward was seen to be through the spiritual renewal entailed in a revolution in culture". The group members were discontent with the political and intellectual composition of Hungary, however, "they rejected a materialist Marxist critique of this society. Hungary was to be changed by a spiritual renewal led by those who had reached a significant level of cultural awareness".  Yet they did not exclude Marxist themes and Mannheim's work was influenced by Lukács' Marxist interests, as he credits Marx as the forerunner to the sociology of knowledge.

German phase (1919–1933) 
This was Mannheim's most productive period, as this is when he turned from philosophy to sociology to inquire into the roots of culture. In the early part of his stay in Germany, Mannheim published his doctoral dissertation "Structural Epistemology of Knowledge", which discusses his theory of the structure of epistemology, the "relations between the knower, the known and the to be known…for Mannheim based on psychology, logic and ontology". Sociologist Brian Longhurst explains, his work on epistemology represents the height of his early "idealist" phase, and transition to hermeneutic "issues of interpretation within culture".

In this essay, Mannheim introduces "the hermeneutic problem of the relationship between the whole and the parts". He argues the differences between art, the natural sciences, and philosophy "with respect to truth claims", stating science always tries to disprove one theory, where art never does this and can coexist in more than one worldview; philosophy falls in between the two extremes. Mannheim posits the "danger of relativism", in which historical process yields cultural product; "if thought to be relative to a historical period, it may be unavailable to a historical period"

Mannheim's ambitious attempt to promote a comprehensive sociological analysis of the structures of knowledge was treated with suspicion by Marxists and neo-Marxists of the grouping that was later recognized as an antecedent of the Frankfurt School. They saw the rising popularity of the sociology of knowledge as neutralization and a betrayal of Marxist inspiration. Arguments between Mannheim and Horkheimer played out in faculty forums, like the Kant Gesellschaft and Paul Tillich's Christian Socialist discussion group.

Horkheimer's Institute at the time was best known for the empirical work it encouraged, and several of Mannheim's doctoral students used its resources.  While Mannheim and Horkheimer's contest looms large in retrospect, Mannheim's most active contemporary competitors were in fact other academic sociologists, notably the proto-fascist Leipzig professor, Hans Freyer, and the proponent of formal sociology and leading figure in the profession, Leopold von Wiese.

Theory of the sociology of knowledge and sociology of culture 

Mannheim's theory on the sociology of knowledge is based on some of the epistemological discoveries of Immanuel Kant.  Sociology of knowledge is known as a section of the greater field known as the sociology of culture. The idea of sociology of culture is defined as the relationship between culture and society.

There are two main branches of sociology of culture: a moderate branch and a radical branch. The moderate branch is represented by Max Scheler, who believed that social conditions do not affect the content of knowledge. The radical branch, on the contrary, highlighted that society is determined by all aspects of culture. When it came to the sociology of knowledge, Mannheim believed that it established a dependence of knowledge on social reality. Though Mannheim was far from being a Marxist, sociology of knowledge was largely based on Marx's theories regarding classes.

Mannheim's central question of the sociology of knowledge, which tried to understand the relationship between society and knowledge, demonstrated his endeavors to solve the issue of "historical nature and unity of mind and life." Mannheim affirmed the sociology of knowledge as an "extrinsic interpretation and sets apart from the immanent interpretation of thought products." The immanent interpretation is based on one's understanding of intellectual content, which is limited to theoretical content of knowledge and the extrinsic interpretation is based on the capability to understand manifestations.

Knowing the difference between these two types of interpretations helped Mannheim create a place for the sociology of knowledge in the scientific system, thus leaving the sociology of knowledge to stand opposite of the traditional human sciences and to interpret knowledge through an exploration of social reality. Mannheim claimed that the sociology of knowledge has to be understood as the visionary expression of "historical experience which has social reality at its vital center."

In 1920, a series of his essays were published in Germany under the name Essays in Sociology of Knowledge. These essays focused on the search for the meaning behind social reality, the notion of "truth" and the role of the empirical intellectual in search for these truths. Another collection of his essays, Essays in Sociology of Culture, was posthumously published in 1956. It basically served to merge his concern with social reality and democracy. According to Mannheim, ideology was linked to a notion of reality, meanwhile culture focuses more so on the mind of the individual and how it perceives that reality, both, however, "still concerned with the role of the intelligentsia."

Ideology and Utopia (1929) 

Mannheim is most well known for his study and analysis of ideologies and utopias. One of his main ideas regarding utopias is what he considers the "utopian mentality", which Mannheim describes in four ideal types:

 orgiastic chiliasm
 liberal humanist utopias
 the conservative idea
 modern communism

In Ideology and Utopia, he argued that the application of the term ideology ought to be broadened. He traced the history of the term from what he called a "particular" view. This view saw ideology as the perhaps deliberate obscuring of facts. This view gave way to a "total" conception (most notably in Marx), which argued that a whole social group's thought was formed by its social position (e.g. the proletariat's beliefs were conditioned by their relationship to the means of production). However, he called for a further step, which he called a general total conception of ideology, in which it was recognized that everyone's beliefs—including the social scientist's—were a product of the context they were created in. Thus, to Mannheim, "ideas were products of their times and of the social statuses of their proponents."

Mannheim points out social class, location and generation as the greatest determinants of knowledge. He feared this could lead to relativism but proposed the idea of relationism as an antidote. To uphold the distinction, he maintained that the recognition of different perspectives according to differences in time and social location appears arbitrary only to an abstract and disembodied theory of knowledge.

The list of reviewers of the German Ideology and Utopia includes a remarkable roll call of individuals who became famous in exile, after the rise of Hitler: Hannah Arendt, Max Horkheimer, Herbert Marcuse, Paul Tillich, Hans Speier, Günther Stern (aka Günther Anders), Waldemar Gurian, Siegfried Kracauer, Otto Neurath, Karl August Wittfogel, Béla Fogarasi, and Leo Strauss. In the early 1970s, Erich Fromm and Michael Maccoby would later illustrate scientifically the effects of social class and economic structure on personality in their landmark study Social Character in a Mexican Village.

Out of all of his works, Mannheim's book Ideologie und Utopie was the most widely debated book by a living sociologist in Germany during the Weimar Republic. It was first published in German in 1929, with the English publication, Ideology and Utopia, following in 1936.  This work has been a standard in American-style international academic sociology, carried by the interest it aroused in the United States.

Mannheim and macro-sociology 

Mannheim's work was written mostly through a macrosociological lens. While writing Ideology and Utopia Mannheim's fundamental questions were "why does man behave differently in the framework of different social group and class structures." In answering this question, his intellectual contribution to sociology was focused more on social problems than sociological problems. The consolidation of his work focused on topics such as "social stability, social groups and the psychic differentials corresponding to social status or class cleavages." To Mannheim the public was essential and fundamental to a democratic society. Therefore, assuring that not one ideology dictate all of the public is vital for the preservation of democracy.

British phase (1933–1947) 
In his British phase Mannheim attempted a comprehensive analysis of the structure of modern society by way of democratic social planning and education. Mannheim's first major work published during this period was Man and Society in an Age of Reconstruction 1935, in which he argues for a shift from the liberal order of laissez-faire capitalism, "founded on the unregulated trade cycle, unextended democracy, free competition and ideas of competitive individualism" to planned democracy.

In Diagnosis of Our Time, Mannheim expands on this argument and expresses concern for the transition from liberal order to planned democracy, according to Longhurst, arguing "...the embryonic planned democratic society can develop along democratic or dictatorial routes...as expressed in the totalitarian societies of Nazi Germany and the Soviet Union". His work was admired more by educators, social workers, and religious thinkers than it was by the small community of British sociologists. His books on planning nevertheless played an important part in the political debates of the immediate post-war years, both in the United States and in several European countries.

Legacy
Mannheim's sociological theorizing has been the subject of numerous book-length studies, evidence of an international interest in his principal themes. Mannheim was not the author of any work he himself considered a finished book, but rather of some fifty major essays and treatises, most later published in book form. In Spain his theories were followed by Artur Juncosa Carbonell.

Selected works
 Mannheim, K. ([1922-24] 1980) Structures of Thinking. London: Routledge & Kegan Paul.
 Mannheim, K. ([1925] 1986) Conservatism. A Contribution to the Sociology of Knowledge. London: Routledge & Kegan Paul.
 Mannheim, K. (1929), Ideologie und Utopie
Mannheim, K. ([1930] 2001) Sociology as Political Education. New Brunswick, NJ. Transaction.
 Mannheim, K. (1935 (English 1940)) Man and Society in an Age of Reconstruction. London: Routledge.
 Mannheim, K. (1936) Ideology and Utopia. London: Routledge.
 Mannheim, K. (1950) "Freedom, Power, and Democratic Planning." Oxford University Press
 Mannheim, K. (1971. 1993) From Karl Mannheim. New Brunswick, NJ. Transaction.

See also

Books
 History and Class Consciousness

Topics
 Theory of generations

References

Further reading 
 Richard Aldrich, (2002) The Institute of Education 1902-2002: A centenary history, London: Institute of Education.
 David Frisby, (1983) The Alienated Mind, London: Heineman.
 David Kettler, Volker Meja, and Nico Stehr (1984), Karl Mannheim, London: Tavistock.
 David Kettler and Volker Meja, (1995) Karl Mannheim and the Crisis of Liberalism, New Brunswick and London: Transaction.
 Colin Loader, (1985) The Intellectual Development of Karl Mannheim, Cambridge: Cambridge University Press.
 Colin Loader and David Kettler (2001) Karl Mannheim's Sociology as Political Education New Brunswick and London: Transaction.
 Volker Meja and Nico Stehr (eds), (1982[1990]) Knowledge and Politics. The Sociology of Knowledge Dispute, London: Routledge & Kegan Paul.
 Eva Karadi and Erzsebet Vezer,  (1985) Georg Lukacs,  Karl Mannheim und der Sonntagskreis, Frankfurt/M: Sendler.
 Reinhard Laube (2004) Karl Mannheim und die Krise des Historismus, Goettingen: Vandenhoeck & Ruprecht.
 Guglielmo Rinzivillo, Scienza e valori in Karl Mannheim, Roma, Armando Armando, 2016

External links

Studies of Karl Mannheim
Likenesses of Mannheim in the National Portrait Gallery
 

1893 births
1947 deaths
Writers from Budapest
People from the Kingdom of Hungary
Hungarian Jews
Jewish emigrants from Nazi Germany to the United Kingdom
Hungarian sociologists
Jewish sociologists
20th-century Hungarian writers
20th-century Hungarian male writers
Academic staff of Goethe University Frankfurt
Academic staff of Heidelberg University
Academics of the London School of Economics
Utopian studies scholars